Baker Institute may refer to:

 James A. Baker III Institute for Public Policy, a think tank on the campus of Rice University in Houston, Texas
 Baker Heart and Diabetes Institute, an Australian research institute headquartered in Melbourne, Victoria
 The Baker Institute for Animal Health, a veterinary research institute at Cornell University in Ithaca, NY